Pinepine Te Rika  (1857–1954) was a New Zealand tuhoe woman of mana. Of Māori descent, she identified with the Tuhoe iwi. She was born in Rahitiroa, Bay of Plenty, New Zealand in about 1857.

References

1857 births
1954 deaths
Ngāi Tūhoe people